SWPL may refer to:

 Scottish Women's Premier League, an association football league in Scotland
 South West Peninsula League, an association football league in England
 Stuff White People Like, a satirical weblog